Pachyagrotis tischendorfi is a moth of the family Noctuidae. It is found in the steppes and semi-deserts of south-eastern Turkey, Armenia, Lebanon, Israel, Syria, Jordan and Saudi Arabia.

Adults are on wing in November. There is one generation per year.

External links
 Noctuinae of Israel

Noctuinae
Insects of Turkey
Moths of the Middle East